God of Wonders is a live album by Paul Baloche, released in 2002.

Track listing 
"Intro" – 1:02
"Face to Face" (P. Baloche, Marc Byrd, Steve Hindalong) – 4:37
"Stir Up a Hunger" (P. Baloche, Rita Baloche) – 4:52
"The Way" (P. Baloche) – 5:15
"Your Love Is Reaching Me" (Rita Baloche) – 4:50
"Jesus You Are" (Rita Baloche) – 5:10
"But for Your Grace/Amazing Grace" (Rita Baloche, John Newton) – 3:37
"Sacrifice" (P. Baloche) – 5:25
"Take My Life and Let It Be" (Frances Ridley Havergal) – 0:47
"God of Wonders" (Marc Byrd, Steve Hindalong) – 6:17
"Holy, Holy, Holy! Lord God Almighty" (John Bacchus Dykes, Reginald Heber) – 1:26
"Keep My Heart" (P. Baloche) – 6:06
"Monologue" – 1:44
"We Humble Ourselves" (P. Baloche, Rita Baloche, Malcolm du Plessis) – 5:38
"New Song" (Rita Baloche) – 4:32
"Monologue" – 0:38
"The Song of Jabez" (P. Baloche) – 6:47

Personnel 
 Paul Baloche – lead vocals, acoustic guitar 
 Chris Springer – acoustic piano, keyboards
 Phil Madeira – accordion
 Rita Baloche – backing vocals, acoustic guitar (6)
 Marc Byrd – electric guitars, acoustic guitar (10), backing vocals (10)
 Milo Deering – acoustic guitar, mandolin, pedal steel guitar
 Chris Donahue – bass 
 Dennis Holt – drums 
 Steve Hindalong – percussion 
 David Henry – cello 
 Jacob Lawson – viola, violin 
 Perry Coleman – backing vocals 
 Christine Glass-Byrd – backing vocals

Production 
 Don Moen – executive producer 
 Chris Thomason – executive producer 
 Chris Springer – A&R 
 Paul Baloche – producer 
 Marc Byrd – producer 
 Steve Hindalong – producer 
 Greg Hunt – recording 
 Gary Leach – recording
 David Schober – mixing 
 Hank Williams – mastering 
 Right Hand Design – graphic design 
 Thomas Petillo – photography 

Studios
 Recorded and Mixed at Rosewood Studios (Tyler, Texas).
 Mastered at MasterMix (Nashville, Tennessee).

References
 

2001 live albums
Paul Baloche albums